The 2014 Cedar Rapids Titans season was the third season of the Cedar Rapids Titans as a professional indoor football franchise in the Indoor Football League (IFL). One of nine teams competing in the IFL for the 2014 season, the Cedar Rapids Titans were members of the league's United Conference.

The Titans played their home games at the U.S. Cellular Center in downtown Cedar Rapids, Iowa. The team is led by head coach Mark Stoute, the 2013 Indoor Football League Coach of the Year. The Titans Dolls dance squad is led by dance team director Lindsay Wray.

Off-field moves
After playing its first two seasons in the 4,000 seat Cedar Rapids Ice Arena, the team made a twice-delayed move to the newly renovated 6,900-seat U.S. Cellular Center in downtown Cedar Rapids for its home games. The team also changed practice facilities for the 2014 season, moving from SportZone in Hiawatha to the Game Winning Entertainment Sports Center in northeast Cedar Rapids.

Roster moves
The coaching staff for 2014 includes head coach Mark Stoute (the 2013 Indoor Football League Coach of the Year) and initially included assistant coaches Sean Ponder, Michael Custer, Derrick Reaves, and Ed Flanagan. By April 2014, coaches Ponder, Reaves, and Flanagan had left the team while Terry Bates signed on as defensive backs coach and Ameer Ismail joined as defensive coordinator.

Awards and honors
On February 26, 2014, the IFL announced its Week 1 Players of the Week. Honorable Mentions were made for wide receiver Carl Sims for offense and kicker Rockne Belmonte for special teams play. On March 12, 2014, the IFL announced its Week 3 Players of the Week. Cedar Rapids Titans running back LaRon Council was named as the Offensive Player of the Week. Defensive lineman Xzavie Jackson received an Honorable Mention for defense. Kicker Rockne Belmonte and kick returner Robert Brown each received an Honorable Mention for special teams play.

On March 19, 2014, the IFL announced its Week 4 Players of the Week. Cedar Rapids Titans running back LaRon Council received an Honorable Mention for offense. Kicker Rockne Belmonte received a third Honorable Mention for special teams play. On March 26, 2014, the IFL announced its Week 5 Players of the Week. Cedar Rapids Titans linebacker Pasquale Vacchio was named as the Defensive Player of the Week. Kicker Rockne Belmonte was named as the Special Teams Player of the Week. Wide receiver Bryan Pray received an Honorable Mention for offense. On April 2, 2014, the IFL announced its Week 6 Players of the Week. Cedar Rapids Titans kicker Rockne Belmonte received his fourth Honorable Mention this season for special teams play.

On April 9, 2014, the IFL announced its Week 7 Players of the Week. Cedar Rapids Titans defensive lineman Kyle Jenkins was named as the Defensive Player of the Week. Quarterback Spencer Ohm received an Honorable Mention for offense. Defensive back Ricky Johnson received an Honorable Mention for defense. Kicker Rockne Belmonte received his fifth Honorable Mention for special teams play. On April 23, 2014, the IFL announced its Week 9 Players of the Week. Cedar Rapids Titans kicker Rockne Belmonte was named as the Special Teams Player of the Week for the second time this season. Kick returner Robert Brown received an Honorable Mention for special teams play.

Schedule
Key:

Pre-season

Regular season

Postseason

Roster

Standings

References

External links
Cedar Rapids Titans official website
Cedar Rapids Titans official statistics
Cedar Rapids Titans at The Gazette

Cedar Rapids
Cedar Rapids River Kings
Cedar Rapids Titans